George Bradshaw  was an English academic.

Bagshaw graduated B.A. from Balliol College, Oxford in 1630 and M.A. in 1635, in which year he became a Fellow. He was Master of Balliol from 1646 to 1651.

Notes

17th-century English people
Alumni of Balliol College, Oxford
Fellows of Balliol College, Oxford
Masters of Balliol College, Oxford